Tyson Research Center is a  environmental field station owned and operated by Washington University in St. Louis in the St. Louis, Missouri metropolitan area east of Eureka. It is a member of the Organization of Biological Field Stations (OBFS).

Tyson provides opportunities for environmental research and education for students and faculty from Washington University and beyond. Infrastructure and programs facilitate multi-scale research and teaching opportunities and collaboration across disciplines, institutions, and levels of academic training.

Tyson Research Center was originally part of the Tyson Valley Powder Plant in World War II. It is bordered to the east by Lone Elk County Park, to the west by West Tyson County Park, to the north by Castlewood State Park, and to the south by Interstate 44.

Tyson Research Center hosts the Endangered Wolf Center.

Tyson also has a weather station and monitors acid rain as part of the National Atmospheric Deposition Program.

References

External links

Tyson Research Center Homepage

Washington University in St. Louis
Buildings and structures in St. Louis County, Missouri
Biological stations
Environmental research institutes